Wesley School is a private, Christian, international school located in Malang, Eastern Java, Indonesia. The school has a population of about 140 students and offers an American educational program from kindergarten to 12th grade.

History
Wesley School was founded in 1972. Up until 1997, Wesley only offered education at the elementary school level. However, in 1997, the decision was made to expand the school up through high school. The first senior class graduated in 2001.

Resources and environment
Wesley provides students with a library of over 15,000 volumes, classrooms, science lab, computer lab, gymnasium, art and music centers, athletic field, new stadium, fitness center, and a spacious campus. The school is located in Malang, a center of education in Indonesia with over forty colleges and universities.

Curriculum
Wesley follows an American curriculum with some adaptations to the international student population. The high school program is a college preparatory course. The academic program is organized on a two semester schedule. A maximum load is seven classes per semester with students carrying seven 50-minute classes a day.

A minimum of 24 credits is required for graduation. 1 credit = 1 year; 0.5 credits = 1 semester. Graduation requirements include:

 4   English
 3   Mathematics
 3   Science
 2   Social Studies
 4   Bible
 2   Foreign Language
 2   Physical Education
 0.5 Senior Project
 0.5 Service Project
 3   Other Electives

Courses
 Sciences: Biology, Chemistry, Physics
 Mathematics: Algebra I, Geometry, Algebra II, Trigonometry, Pre-Calculus, Calculus
 Language Arts: Journalism, English 9, English 10, American Literature, World Literature
 Social Sciences: Modern History, American History, Psychology, Economics
 Biblical Education: Bible Study Methods and Church History, NT Survey and Characteristics of God, World Religions, History of Western Philosophy
 Physical Education: PE, Weight Lifting
 Foreign Languages: Korean (I&II), Mandarin (I&II), Indonesian (I&II), Japanese
 Other Electives: Drama, Art, Music, Student Leadership, Service Project, Senior Project, Study Hall
 Varsity Sports Teams: Soccer, Basketball, Swimming, Badminton

Programs
Non-native English speakers have ESL courses from Kindergarten to Grade 12. Dramas, musicals, and concerts are a part of school life. Other events include the Fine Arts Festival, Field Day, Sports tournaments, Science Fair, Christmas Bazaar, school camps, and Carnival.

College attendance
Alumni have studied at major universities in South Korea, United States, Australia, and Canada, including Harvard University, Duke University, Seoul National University, Yonsei University, and University of Western Australia.

External links/contact

Official school website

Schools in Indonesia
International schools in Indonesia
Christian schools in Indonesia
Educational institutions established in 1972
Schools in East Java